Rafael "Rafi" Peretz (born 7 January 1956) is an Israeli Orthodox rabbi and former politician. A former military officer and helicopter pilot who also served as the Chief Military Rabbi of the Israel Defense Forces, he was the leader of the Jewish Home party. Peretz was a member of the Knesset for the Yamina alliance until he separated from the faction in order to join the Netanyahu-led government.

Early life
Peretz was born in Jerusalem, to parents of Moroccan-Jewish descent. He grew up in the Kiryat HaYovel neighborhood of Western Jerusalem.

He studied at Mercaz HaRav, and then Yeshivat HaKotel; he received semikhah (ordination) from the Chief Rabbinate of Israel.

Military career
Prior to being promoted to the rank of brigadier general, Peretz was the head of the Otzem Pre-Military Academy in Yated, which was relocated from Bnei Atzmon, where he established it in 1993, and a major (reserves) in the Israeli Air Force, where he served as a helicopter pilot. He succeeded Rabbi Avichai Rontzki as Chief Military Rabbi in mid-2010, serving in the post until 2016.

In November 2014, at a tense time in Jerusalem, Peretz caused a public controversy by announcing that the Temple Mount has no religious significance to the Muslim religion. He was quoted as saying, "Ninety percent of the Arabs don't know a thing about the Koran. I tell you with full authority. We know better than many of them." The IDF quickly distanced itself from the rabbi's statements, and stated: "The rabbi is sorry if his remarks offended the Arab population." Ynet characterized Peretz's comments as "explosive".

Political career
Peretz was elected to lead the Jewish Home party on 4 February 2019. The party joined the Union of the Right-Wing Parties alliance for the April 2019 Knesset elections, with Peretz as the alliance's lead candidate. He was elected to the Knesset as the coalition won five seats.

In 2019, Peretz was appointed the interim Minister of Education.

Peretz attracted criticism from within the government and Israeli society in July 2019, when he endorsed gay conversion therapy, and claimed to have personally performed such therapy. Prime Minister Benjamin Netanyahu rejected Peretz's comments as "unacceptable". On July 18, 2019, Peretz said, after protests, that he rejected gay conversion therapy.

In an interview published on 10 January 2020, Peretz told the Israeli daily Yedioth Ahronoth, "In the religious public that lives according to the Torah, a normal family is a man and a woman. [We] don’t need to be ashamed that we live in this natural way", The Times of Israel reported, adding that his comments drew criticism of Israeli LGBT activists and politicians by "suggesting gay marriage was not natural".

In May 2020, as Yamina switched to the opposition before the formation of the Netanyahu–Gantz unity government, Peretz resigned from Yamina and joined the Netanyahu government as the "Minister of Jerusalem Affairs and Heritage".

In January 2021, he announced his retirement from politics.

Personal life
Peretz is married, and has 12 children. He lived in the Gush Katif settlement of Bnei Atzmon prior to the Israeli disengagement from Gaza in 2005, and now lives in Naveh, a village established in 2008 by former residents of Gush Katif. On 1 August 2020, Peretz tested positive for COVID-19.

References

External links

 The official IDF Military Rabbinate website 

1956 births
Living people
20th-century Israeli military personnel
21st-century Israeli military personnel
Critics of Islam
Helicopter pilots
Israel Defense Forces rabbis
Israeli Air Force personnel
Israeli aviators
Israeli generals
Israeli Jews
Israeli military chaplains
Israeli Orthodox rabbis
Israeli people of Moroccan-Jewish descent
Israeli Sephardi Jews
Jewish Israeli politicians
Jewish military personnel
Leaders of political parties in Israel
Members of the 21st Knesset (2019)
Members of the 22nd Knesset (2019–2020)
Members of the 23rd Knesset (2020–2021)
Politicians from Jerusalem
Rabbinic members of the Knesset
Religious Zionist rosh yeshivas
The Jewish Home leaders
Yamina politicians